Margahovit (formerly  Hamzachiman), is a major village in the Lori Province of Armenia.

References

World Gazeteer: Armenia – World-Gazetteer.com

Populated places in Lori Province